Bibb County School District is a school district in Bibb County, Alabama, United States.

Schools
High schools:
 Bibb County High School (Centreville)
 West Blocton High School (West Blocton)

Middle schools:
 Centreville Middle School (Centreville)
 West Blocton Middle School (West Blocton)

Elementary schools:
 Brent (Brent)
 Randolph (Randolph)
 West Blocton (West Blocton)
 Woodstock (Woodstock)

Other:
 Bibb County Career Academy (West Blocton)

See also
Bibb County School District vs. Wickman

References

External links
 

Education in Bibb County, Alabama
School districts in Alabama